Located near Chegutu, Fylde Air Force Base is one of the three main air bases for the Air Force of Zimbabwe home to air defence and regimental training. The base is also tasked with anti air artillery and radar systems training. A full range of amenities, which include workshops, transport fleets, equipment depots, accommodation, sporting and entertainment facilities support the base.

External links
 Air of Zimbabwe Official Website 
 Recruit Quality issues at Field AFB 
 AFZ Bases and Air Fields 

Air Force of Zimbabwe
Zimbabwean airbases